Flower Crew may refer to:
 Flower Crew, a South Korean travel-reality show broadcast in SBS
 Flower Crew: Joseon Marriage Agency, a South Korean historical-romcom television series broadcast in JTBC